Wank is a surname, and may refer to:

 Andreas Wank (born 1988), German ski jumper
 Roland Wank (1898–1970), Hungarian architect

See also 
 Wanka (disambiguation)
 Wanké
 Wänke
 Wanker (surname)
 Wank (disambiguation)

German-language surnames
de:Wank